Hodgson's hawk-cuckoo (Hierococcyx nisicolor), also known as the whistling hawk-cuckoo is a species of cuckoo found in north-eastern India, Myanmar, southern China and southeast Asia.

Hodgson's hawk-cuckoo is a brood parasite. The chick evicts bona fide residents of the parasitized nest, thus becoming the sole occupant.  Under normal circumstances, this would reduce the provisioning rate as the foster parents see only one gape.  To counteract this, the Hodgson's hawk-cuckoo displays gape-coloured patches of skin under its wing to simulate additional gapes; the strategy appears to increase the provisioning rate.  This is in contrast to other species of cuckoo (such as the common cuckoo) which increase the rapidity of high pitched hunger calls to increase the provisioning rate.

Although the skin patch is not gape shaped, it is convincing: host parents occasionally place food into the patch.

Hodgson's hawk-cuckoo was formerly regarded as having four subspecies. The Philippine hawk-cuckoo is now commonly treated as a separate species, H. pectoralis. The remaining forms are also now split into three species: Malaysian hawk-cuckoo (H. fugax), Hodgson's hawk-cuckoo (H. nisicolor) and rufous hawk-cuckoo or northern hawk-cuckoo (H. hyperythrus).

The common name commemorates the British naturalist Brian Houghton Hodgson.

References

Hodgson's hawk-cuckoo
Birds of Eastern Himalaya
Birds of South China
Birds of Hainan
Birds of Myanmar
Birds of Thailand
Birds of Laos
Birds of Vietnam
Hodgson's hawk-cuckoo
Taxobox binomials not recognized by IUCN